Three Forks is an unincorporated community in Carbon County, Wyoming, United States.

Three forks, locally known as Three Forks Muddy Gap, was named from its location at a fork in the road. First settled in 1935 when Highway 287 was built. Local Rancher, Robert L. Tully built a small filling station. Then in his sixties, Tully decided to retire from ranching, selling off much of his original homestead to pay for the construction of the station.

References

Unincorporated communities in Carbon County, Wyoming